Waban (ca. 1604-ca. 1685) was the first Native American to convert to Christianity in Massachusetts.

Waban may also refer to:

Waban, Massachusetts, a village of Newton, Massachusetts
Waban (MBTA station), a transit station in the Waban section of Newton, Massachusetts
USS Waban (1880), a United States Navy steamer in commission from 1898 to 1919
, a Design 1015 ship built for the United States Shipping Board in 1919